Paintbrush lily is a common name for several plants and may refer to:

 the genus Haemanthus collectively
 Haemanthus albiflos, sometimes called "white paintbrush lily", a white-flowered bulbous plant native to southern Africa
 Haemanthus coccineus, a scarlet-flowered bulbous plant native to southern Africa
 Scadoxus puniceus, a red-flowered bulbous plant native to southern and eastern Africa

See also
 Castilleja, the paintbrush flowers of western North America